Kasturi Siva Rao (6 March 1913 - 24 February 1966) was an Indian actor, comedian, playback singer, producer and director known for his works in Telugu cinema. He was one of the first star comedians of Telugu cinema.

Career
Kasturi Siva Rao started his career in the film industry as a movie narrator for the silent films produced at that time. Besides providing commentary, he was also a projector operator and had a unique humor to his fame. Theaters would advertise films as having "commentary by Siva Rao". He became an actor with the film Vara Vikrayam in 1939 and shot into the limelight with Chudamani in 1941. B N Reddy's Swarga Seema in 1945 and Balaraju in 1948 catapulted him to stardom.

He became a lead actor with the film Gunasundari Katha in 1949, in which he played the role of a cursed prince. The film became a huge hit and his mannerisms and dialogue were so popular that people started conversing in the same tone. He owned a Buick, which was a rare possession, and whenever people saw the car on roads they used to swarm the car and run along with it. Kasturi Siva Rao later on became a producer and director with the film Paramanandayya Sishyulu in the year 1950.

Selected filmography 
Swarga Seema (స్వర్గసీమ)
Balaraju (బాలరాజు)	28 February 1948	Supporting Actor & playback singer
Laila Majnu (లైలా మజ్ను)	1 October 1949	Supporting Actor
Raksha Rekha (రక్షరేఖ)	1949	Supporting Actor
Gunasundari Katha (గుణసుందరి కథ)	1 October 1949	Hero and playback singer
Paramanandayya Sishyulu  (పరమానందయ్య శిష్యుల కథ)	1950	Supporting Actor, Producer, Director
Swapna Sundari (స్వప్న సుందరి)	1950	Supporting Actor
Sri Lakshmamma Katha (శ్రీ లక్ష్మమ్మ కథ)	1950	Supporting Actor & playback singer
Mantra Dandam 	1951
Stree Sahasam (స్త్రీ సాహసం)	1951	Supporting Actor
Prema (ప్రేమ)	1952	Supporting Actor
Iddaru Pellalu 	1954
Panduranga Mahatyam (పాండురంగ మహత్యం)	28 November 1957	Supporting Actor
Dongalunnaru Jagratha 	1958
Appu Chesi Pappu Koodu (అప్పు చేసి పప్పు కూడు)	14 January 1959	Supporting Actor ( Takku )
Raja Makutam (రాజమకుటం)	24 February 1960	Supporting Actor
Seetharama Kalyanam (సీతారామ కళ్యాణం)	6 January 1961	Supporting Actor
Mugguru Maratilu
Mayalamaari

References

1913 births
Telugu comedians
Telugu male actors
Male actors from Andhra Pradesh
Year of death unknown
Date of death unknown
Indian male comedians
Male actors in Telugu cinema
Indian male film actors
People from Kakinada
20th-century Indian male actors